"Give Him Up" is the second single from Canadian rock band Faber Drive's second album, Can't Keep a Secret. It peaked at number 26 on the Canadian Hot 100.

The song officially debuted on November 30, 2009. A video was released by the band via their official YouTube channel on January 13, 2010. It features the band in a bowling alley, showcasing a story about a teenaged boy cheating on his girlfriend by going on a date with another girl. His girlfriend secretly stalks the couple and eventually busts them by the end of the video.

Charts

Year-end charts

References

Faber Drive songs
2009 singles
2010 singles
Songs written by Josh Ramsay
2009 songs
Universal Records singles